Kehillas Yaakov Pupa (also "Puppa"; Hebrew/Yiddish: קהלת יעקב פאפא) is a hasidic dynasty, named after the Yiddish name of the town of its origin (known in Hungarian as Pápa). 

Before World War II Pupa had a yeshiva. The whole community was deported to the Auschwitz concentration camp, and only a few survived. There are no longer any Jews there.

The group is based in Williamsburg, Brooklyn, with branches in the Boro Park section of Brooklyn, Monsey, New York, Los Angeles, and Ossining, New York. It is headed by the Pupa rebbe, who has several thousand followers.

Pupa has more than 7,000 students enrolled in its yeshivas, girls schools, summer camps, and kollelim in Williamsburg, Boro Park, Monsey, Westchester County, New York, Montreal, Jerusalem, and elsewhere. In Williamsburg, Pupa is second in size to the Satmar Hasidim, with whom they share many communal facilities.

Lineage 
 Moshe Greenwald (1853–1910).

 Yaakov Yechezkiah Greenwald I (1882–1941)

 Yosef Greenwald (1903–1984) 

 Yaakov Yechezkiya Greenwald II (born 1948)

Kiryas Pupa and Kehilath Yakov Rabbinical Seminary 
Kiryas Pupa is a village in Ossining, New York, established by Yosef Greenwald. It includes the Kehilath Yakov Rabbinical Seminary, a 4-year school, and a cemetery.

More than 800 students are enrolled in the graduate yeshiva Gedolah, located on a pastoral 140-acre campus.

References

External links 
 Pupa Kipas Chasanim
 Pupa Monsey
 Congregation Kehilas Yakov Pupa on the Kosher Travel Info website
 Kiryas Pupa פאפא שטעטל on Google
 Pupa Cemetery on Google

Hasidic dynasties
Jewish Hungarian history
Hasidic Judaism in New York City
Hasidic Judaism in New York (state)
Hasidic Judaism in Europe
Hasidic anti-Zionism
Hungarian-American culture in New York City
Hungarian-Jewish culture in New York (state)
Greenwald family